Six Are Dead or The Murder of Ipsala (Turkish: Altı Ölü Var/İpsala Cinayeti) is a 1953 Turkish adventure film directed by Lütfi Akad and starring Lale Oraloğlu, Cahit Irgat and Turan Seyfioğlu.

Cast
 Lale Oraloğlu as Yanola  
 Cahit Irgat as Ali Rıza  
 Turan Seyfioğlu as Muhittin  
 Nevin Aypar as Fatma 
 Şevki Artun as The butcher  
 Muazzez Arçay as Zeynep  
 Settar Körmükçü as Raşit  
 Feridun Çölgeçen

References

Bibliography
 Gönül Dönmez-Colin. The Routledge Dictionary of Turkish Cinema. Routledge, 2013.

External links
 

1953 films
1953 adventure films
1950s Turkish-language films
Turkish adventure films
Films directed by Lütfi Akad
Turkish black-and-white films